Koro is a live album by Numb, released in 1996 by Gift Records.

Reception

Jason Ankeny of AllMusic awarded Koro three out of five stars. Sonic Boom praised the band for sounding even more successful in a live setting, saying "the amount of power and emotion that David Collings brings with his vocals and the atmosphere that Don is able to create with his mixture of guitar and keyboards throughout will definitely make you wish that you could see them live, even if you already have."

Track listing

Personnel
Adapted from the Koro liner notes.

Numb
 David Collings – lead vocals, keyboards, percussion, mixing
 Don Gordon – guitar, keyboards, percussion, mixing

Additional musicians
 Richard Hanley – drums, electronic percussion

Production and design
 Kohei Amano – recording
 Satoshi Kanamoto – engineering
 MMM Graphics – cover art, design

Release history

References

External links 
 Koro at Discogs (list of releases)

1996 live albums
Numb (band) albums